Horváth is a common Hungarian surname. "Horváth" is the 2nd or 4th most common surname in Hungary as well as the most common in Slovakia. 
It's thought to derive from Hungarian horvát ("Croat") spelled without the final h in old orthography. The related Croatian surname Horvat, which is derived from an older version of the  noun "Hrvat" ("Croat"), is the most common surname in Croatia or the Croatian diaspora. Members of this family can be found across the world, and are most numerous in the United States. Variations of the name include Horvat, Horvaty, Hrvat, Chorbadi, Orbath, Orvath, Orvat.

People named Horváth
Ádám Horváth (born 1981), Hungarian chess grandmaster
Adrián Horváth (born 1987), Hungarian footballer
Adrian Pavel Horvat (born 1990), Romanian footballer
Adrienne Horvath (1925–2012), French politician
Alexander Horváth (born 1938), Slovak footballer
András Horváth (disambiguation)
Andrea Horwath (born 1962), Leader of the New Democratic Party in Ontario, Canada
Antonio Horvath (1950–2018), Chilean senator
Attila Horváth (disambiguation)
Bronco Horvath (1930–2019), Canadian hockey player
Csaba Horváth (canoeist) (born 1971), Hungarian sprint canoeist
Csaba Horváth (chemical engineer) (1930–2004), Hungarian-American chemical engineer
Csaba Horváth (chess player), Hungarian chess grandmaster
Csaba Horváth (footballer) (born 1982), Slovak football central defender
Dániel Horváth, Hungarian footballer
Dezsö J. Horváth, Canadian businessman and educator
Eva Horváthová (born 1974), Slovak physician and politician, MP (since 2012)
Ethan Horvath (born 1995), American soccer player
Ferenc Horváth (born 1973), Hungarian footballer
Gábor Horváth (disambiguation)
Gergely Horváth (born 1975), Hungarian javelin thrower
Géza Horváth (1847–1937), Hungarian entomologist
Joan Horvath, American astronomer, aeronautic scientist, writer, and entrepreneur
Johann Horvath (1903–1968), Austrian footballer
Johann Baptiste Horvath (1732–1799), Hungarian academic and university professor
József Horváth (disambiguation)
Karoly Horvath, Hungarian-American pediatric gastroenterologist
Károly Horváth (1950–2015), Romanian-born Hungarian musician
Laura Horvath (born 1997), Hungarian CrossFit athlete
Les Horvath (1921–1995), American football player
Mihály Horváth (1809–1878), Hungarian bishop, historian, and politician.
Nick Horvath (born 1981), American-New Zealand basketball player
Ödön von Horváth (1901–1938) German-writing Austro-Hungarian-born playwright and novelist
Opika von Méray Horváth (1889–1977), Hungarian figure skater
Pavel Horváth (born 1975), Czech footballer
Péter Horváth (born 1974), Hungarian swimmer
Polly Horvath (born 1957), American-Canadian author
Rudolf Horváth (born 1947), Slovak Olympic handball player
Ryan Horvath (born 1983), American college football player
Sascha Horvath (born 1996), Austrian footballer
Steve Horvath (born 1967), American aging researcher and inventor of the Horvath clock
Tamás Horváth (born 1951), Hungarian chess master
Vlastimil Horváth (born 1977), Romani singer
William Horvath (born 1938), American politician and conservationist
Zander Horvath (born 1998), American football player
Zoltán Horváth (disambiguation)

Fictional characters
 Detective Carl Horvath character in the TV series Queer as Folk
 Dale Horvath in The Walking Dead
 Hannah Horvath, character in the TV series Girls
 Technical Sergeant Mike Horvath in Saving Private Ryan, portrayed by Tom Sizemore
 Dr. Anthony Horvath, a Galactic scientist in The Mote in God's Eye
 Villain in the movie The Sorcerers Apprentice portrayed by Alfred Molina
 Horvath Blayne, appearing in August Derleth's short fiction story The Black Island

See also
 
 Horvát (Horvat)
 Hrovat (Chrovat)

References 

Hungarian-language surnames
Hungarian words and phrases
Surnames of Slavic origin
Ethnonymic surnames